The 2001 NASCAR Winston Cup Series was the 53rd season of professional stock car racing in the United States, the 30th modern-era Cup series. It began on February 11, 2001, at Daytona International Speedway and ended on November 23, 2001, at New Hampshire International Speedway. Jeff Gordon of Hendrick Motorsports was declared as the series champion for the fourth time in seven years.

The season was marred by a two-car collision at the end of the season-opening Daytona 500, which claimed the life of seven-time Series champion Dale Earnhardt. The accident resulted in safety upgrades being instituted. It also was the first year to have a unified television contract with Fox Sports, NBC Sports, and Turner Sports/TNT broadcasting the season's races; previous seasons saw each racetrack negotiate their own TV coverage, creating a patchwork of broadcast companies covering races throughout the season. Dodge returned to the sport for the first time since 1985 after DaimlerChrysler spent six years in the CART FedEx Championship Series via Mercedes-Benz brand as an engine supplier. Chevrolet captured the NASCAR Manufacturers' Championship with 16 wins and 248 points.

Teams and drivers

Complete schedule

Limited schedule

Schedule

Races

Budweiser Shootout 

The Budweiser Shootout, an invitational event for all recent Bud Pole winners, was held February 11 at Daytona International Speedway. Ken Schrader drew the pole. This was the first race broadcast on Fox.

Top 10 Results

 20 - Tony Stewart
  3 - Dale Earnhardt
  2 - Rusty Wallace
 88 - Dale Jarrett
 99 - Jeff Burton
  8 - Dale Earnhardt Jr.
 18 - Bobby Labonte
  6 - Mark Martin
 28 - Ricky Rudd
 31 - Mike Skinner

This was the only time that Dale Earnhardt would finish 2nd in this race.

Gatorade 125s 

The Gatorade 125s, qualifying races for the Daytona 500, were held February 15 at Daytona International Speedway. Bill Elliott and Stacy Compton started on pole for both races, respectively. The qualifying races were broadcast live for the first time; races prior to 2001 were broadcast on tape delay.

Race One Top 10 Results

 40 - Sterling Marlin
 25 - Jerry Nadeau
  3 - Dale Earnhardt
 96 - Andy Houston
 26 - Jimmy Spencer
 24 - Jeff Gordon
 01 - Jason Leffler
 51 - Jeff Purvis
 15 - Michael Waltrip
 19 - Casey Atwood
This would unexpectedly be the final top 5 Speedweeks finish for Dale Earnhardt.

Race Two Top 10 Results

 31 - Mike Skinner
  8 - Dale Earnhardt Jr.
 99 - Jeff Burton
 22 - Ward Burton
  2 - Rusty Wallace
 36 - Ken Schrader
 17 - Matt Kenseth
 32 - Ricky Craven
 93 - Dave Blaney
  6 - Mark Martin

43rd Daytona 500 

The 43rd Daytona 500 was held February 18, 2001 at Daytona International Speedway.

Top 10 Results
 15 - Michael Waltrip
  8 - Dale Earnhardt Jr.
  2 - Rusty Wallace
 28 - Ricky Rudd
  9 - Bill Elliott
  7 - Mike Wallace
 40 - Sterling Marlin
 55 - Bobby Hamilton
 12 - Jeremy Mayfield
 92 - Stacy Compton

Failed to qualify: Dave Marcis (No. 71), Todd Bodine (No. 66), Hut Stricklin (No. 90), Rick Mast (No. 50), Derrike Cope (No. 37), Norm Benning (No. 84), Carl Long (No. 85), Morgan Shepherd (No. 80), Dwayne Leik (No. 72)

With the changes in the aerodynamics package, this race was going to go down as the greatest Daytona 500 ever. Unfortunately, this race went down as the darkest day in NASCAR history, and perhaps in the history of auto racing. Dale Earnhardt, 7 time Winston Cup champion, and perhaps the greatest NASCAR driver of all-time, was battling for 3rd position, racing in defense mode in the closing laps of the race, trying to block the entire field, so he can protect the lead of his 2 team cars of Michael Waltrip and son Dale Earnhardt, Jr.. However, in turns 3 and 4 on the final lap,  Earnhardt misjudged on blocking Sterling Marlin, who held his line on the inside lane, and got loose off of Marlin's right front fender. Earnhardt would over correct his car, shoot his car up in front of the field, collect Ken Schrader by making contact with Schrader's driver's side door, and both cars would  crash into the turn 4 wall. The angle of Earnhardt's car getting into Schrader made him crash into the wall head on. Schrader's car sustained right front and passenger side damage. Schrader climbed out of his car right away. Unfortunately, Dale Earnhardt died instantly as a result of his injuries. His cause of death was a basilar skull fracture. Earnhardt finished 12th, and Schrader finished 13th, both 1 lap down. NASCAR's greatest race robbed the sport as a whole by taking the life of its greatest driver ever.
After Darrell Waltrip retired from Winston Cup racing at the end of 2000, Dale Earnhardt went into 2001 as NASCAR's winningest active driver with 76 career victories. He had been NASCAR's winningest active champion since 1993 after Richard Petty's Retirement. He would capture 2 more titles in the process, winning in 1993 and 1994. His 1994 title win would tie Richard Petty for most Championships at 7. After finishing runner-up to Bobby Labonte at the end of 2000, Dale Earnhardt was poised to dominate the 2001 season and capture an all-time record 8th Winston Cup Championship. However, after Dale Earnhardt's unexpected death, his 2 close friends/greatest adversaries, Rusty Wallace and Jeff Gordon, would now become the top 2 leaders in Winston Cup competition. Wallace would now become the winningest active driver with 53 career victories, and Gordon would now become the winningest active champion with 3 Winston Cup titles.
In 22 full-time seasons, Dale Earnhardt would unexpectedly finish his career with 676 career starts, 648 consecutive starts, 7 NASCAR championships, 3 championship runner-up finishes, 14 top 5 points finishes, 20 top 10 points finishes, 22 poles, 76 career wins, 281 top 5s, and 428 top 10s.
This was the first race that featured cars from Chrysler Motors (in this case, the Dodge manufacturing family) since 1985.
50th career pole for Bill Elliott. This was Elliott's fourth Daytona 500 pole in his career, and the first time driving a Dodge. This was Elliott's first pole since Richmond back in September 1997. As of 2020, Bill Elliott is the only driver to score his 50th career pole in the Daytona 500.
Michael Waltrip won his first career points race in his 463rd career start, the longest drought of any driver in NASCAR history before getting their first win.
Stacy Compton, the outside pole-sitter, scored his only Top 10 finish in his career in this race.
Rookies Andy Houston, Casey Atwood, Buckshot Jones, Kurt Busch, Ron Hornaday Jr., and Jason Leffler made their first Daytona 500 appearances in this race. Only three of these rookies—Houston, Jones, and Hornaday Jr.—made the Daytona 500 for the only time, while Busch went on to win the 2017 Daytona 500.
Tony Stewart took a wild ride in this race on lap 173, getting turned by Ward Burton, going over Robby Gordon, flipping twice, and landing on his teammate Bobby Labonte.
As of 2022, this is the last race to not feature any active drivers. Kurt Busch is currently inactive due to concussion protocols, and Kevin Harvick would unexpectedly replace Dale Earnhardt in the following event at Rockingham after his fatal crash but Atlanta was supposted to be making his Cup debut for the 3rd Childress car #30 America Online Chevy.

Dura Lube 400 

The Dura Lube 400 started on February 25 but ended on February 26 due to a rain delay, making it a two-day race at the North Carolina Speedway. Jeff Gordon won the pole.

Top 10 Results
  1 - Steve Park
 18 - Bobby Labonte
 24 - Jeff Gordon
 20 - Tony Stewart
 32 - Ricky Craven
 10 - Johnny Benson
  2 - Rusty Wallace
 40 - Sterling Marlin
 93 - Dave Blaney
 88 - Dale Jarrett

Failed to qualify: Andy Houston (No. 96), Kyle Petty (No. 45)

This race was won by DEI driver Steve Park in an emotional victory just one week after Earnhardt's death. It was his last career victory.
Following the death of Dale Earnhardt, NASCAR on FOX, and later on in the season, NASCAR on NBC and TNT, would pay tribute to Dale Earnhardt with a silent lap 3. Unfortunately, however, in this race, along with the next 2 races, the caution would come out either on or before the 3rd lap.
This would be the first Winston Cup race without Dale Earnhardt since the 1979 Southern 500 at Darlington. Earnhardt's career unexpectedly ended after 648 consecutive starts (his career ended with a total of 676). He was set to pass his 1979 Rookie rival Terry Labonte as NASCAR's Iron Man during the 2001 season, if he had never crashed at Daytona. Labonte held the Iron Man record with 655 consecutive starts, and his streak ended when he had to miss the 2000 Brickyard 400 due to injury. Earnhardt would have made his 656th consecutive start at Talladega in April.
Richard Childress placed Busch Grand National driver Kevin Harvick into the car formerly driven by Earnhardt, changed the car's number from No. 3 to No. 29, and the paint scheme from primarily black to primarily white. Because of that, the race was Harvick's first start in the Winston Cup Series.
Dale Earnhardt Jr. suffered a crash on the first lap of the race, in which his car hit the outside wall in an eerily similar fashion to his father's fatal crash a week earlier, but Earnhardt Jr. was not seriously injured.
After this race, Rusty Wallace would take over the points lead, making this the first time since 1998 that he has done so. This would be the only race of 2001 that Rusty would leave an event as the points leader. This was also the final time in his career that Rusty Wallace would lead the points.

UAW-Daimler Chrysler 400

The UAW-Daimler Chrysler 400 was held March 4 at Las Vegas Motor Speedway. Dale Jarrett won the pole.

Top 10 Results

 24 - Jeff Gordon
 88 - Dale Jarrett
 40 - Sterling Marlin
 10 - Johnny Benson
 66 - Todd Bodine
  6 - Mark Martin
  1 - Steve Park
 29 - Kevin Harvick
 14 - Ron Hornaday Jr.
 26 - Jimmy Spencer

Failed to qualify: Kyle Petty (No. 45), Brendan Gaughan (No. 62), Andy Houston (No. 96), Rick Mast (No. 50)

Jeff Gordon won the Winston No Bull 5 Million Bonus.
This was the 53rd career win for Jeff Gordon. With this win, he would tie Rusty Wallace for eighth on NASCAR's all-time win list.
Rusty Wallace would lose the points lead after finishing this race in 43rd (last position), and with that, this would mark the last time ever that he would lead the points standings in his career.
This was Ron Hornaday Jr.'s only Top 10 finish in the Winston Cup Series.

Cracker Barrel Old Country Store 500 

The Cracker Barrel Old Country Store 500 was held March 11 at Atlanta Motor Speedway. Dale Jarrett won the pole.

Top 10 Results

 29 - Kevin Harvick
 24 - Jeff Gordon
 25 - Jerry Nadeau
 88 - Dale Jarrett
  5 - Terry Labonte
 28 - Ricky Rudd
 10 - Johnny Benson
 36 - Ken Schrader
 31 - Mike Skinner
 97 - Kurt Busch (-1 lap)

Failed to qualify: Rick Mast (No. 50), Carl Long (No. 85), Casey Atwood (No. 19)

This race is best remembered for the exciting finish between rookie Kevin Harvick and three-time Cup champion Jeff Gordon. Harvick would outduel the champion in a spectacular finish, winning by only .006 seconds, being the second-closest finish in NASCAR history at the time.  Harvick performed a burnout on the front stretch with three fingers aloft.  It was his first victory in only his third start in the Winston Cup Series, a then-record for fewest starts to first win in the Modern Era of Cup racing. 
This race was originally planned to be Harvick's Cup series debut; as Richard Childress was planning to have Harvick drive #30 AOL-sponsored Chevrolet Monte Carlo for 6 races before moving to the Winston Cup series full-time in 2002.

Carolina Dodge Dealers 400 

The Carolina Dodge Dealers 400 was held March 18 at Darlington Raceway. Jeff Gordon started on pole after qualifying was rained out.

Top Ten Results

 88 - Dale Jarrett
  1 - Steve Park
 12 - Jeremy Mayfield
 26 - Jimmy Spencer
 40 - Sterling Marlin
 43 - John Andretti
 10 - Johnny Benson
 28 - Ricky Rudd
 55 - Bobby Hamilton
  2 - Rusty Wallace

Failed to qualify: Andy Houston (No. 96), Rick Mast (No. 50), Dave Marcis (No. 71)
After 3 straight weeks of having a caution period on either lap 3 or before lap 3, NASCAR finally had lap 3 under green. NASCAR on FOX paid their tributes to Dale Earnhardt with a silent lap 3.

Food City 500 

The Food City 500 was held March 25 at Bristol Motor Speedway. Mark Martin won the pole.

Top Ten Results

 21 - Elliott Sadler*
 43 - John Andretti
 12 - Jeremy Mayfield
 24 - Jeff Gordon
 22 - Ward Burton
  5 - Terry Labonte
  2 - Rusty Wallace
 55 - Bobby Hamilton
  1 - Steve Park
 28 - Ricky Rudd

Failed to qualify: Hut Stricklin (No. 90), Jason Leffler (No. 01), Carl Long (No. 85)
This was Elliott Sadler's first career win and the first for the Wood Brothers Racing team since 1993 with Morgan Shepherd.
It was also the first time cars No. 21 and No. 43 took the top two finishing positions since 1977, but the first time since 1976 Southern 500 that the No. 21 finished on top when David Pearson beat Richard Petty.  As of 2021, it is the most recent time those two cars have finished in the top two spots.

Harrah's 500 

The Harrah's 500 was held April 1 at Texas Motor Speedway. Dale Earnhardt Jr. won the pole.

Top Ten Results

 88 - Dale Jarrett
  1 - Steve Park
 10 - Johnny Benson
 97 - Kurt Busch
 24 - Jeff Gordon
 93 - Dave Blaney
 29 - Kevin Harvick
  8 - Dale Earnhardt Jr.
  6 - Mark Martin
 36 - Ken Schrader

Failed to qualify: Kyle Petty (No. 45), Rick Mast (No. 50)

Virginia 500 

The Virginia 500 was held April 8 at Martinsville Speedway. Jeff Gordon won the pole.

Top Ten Results

 88 - Dale Jarrett
 28 - Ricky Rudd
 99 - Jeff Burton
 55 - Bobby Hamilton
 40 - Sterling Marlin
 17 - Matt Kenseth
 20 - Tony Stewart
 18 - Bobby Labonte
 26 - Jimmy Spencer
 25 - Jerry Nadeau

Failed to qualify: Jason Leffler (No. 01), Hermie Sadler (No. 13), Hut Stricklin (No. 90)

This race would mark the second and final time that Dale Jarrett would score back-to-back victories. The only other time doing that was in 1997 when he won Atlanta and Darlington in the spring.

Talladega 500 

The Talladega 500 was held April 22 at Talladega Superspeedway. Stacy Compton won the pole.

Top Ten Results

 55 - Bobby Hamilton*
 20 - Tony Stewart
 97 - Kurt Busch
  6 - Mark Martin
 18 - Bobby Labonte
 33 - Joe Nemechek
 10 - Johnny Benson
  8 - Dale Earnhardt Jr.
  7 - Mike Wallace
 99 - Jeff Burton

Failed to qualify: Kenny Wallace (No. 27), Kyle Petty (No. 45), Rick Mast (No. 50), Hut Stricklin (No. 90), Andy Hillenburg (No. 49)

 This was Bobby Hamilton's fourth and last win in the Cup Series.
 This was the first win for Andy Petree Racing.
 This was the second caution-free race in the history of Talladega Superspeedway, but the aerodynamics package was vastly different than the first caution-free race, which in turn made the average speed (184.003 mph) slower than the track record.
 Stacy Compton won his first Winston Cup Series pole for this race.
This would have been the race for Dale Earnhardt to become NASCAR's new Iron Man. He was set to pass his 1979 Rookie rival Terry Labonte by making his 656th consecutive start in this event if he had never crashed at Daytona in February. Earnhardt unexpectedly finished his career with 648 consecutive starts. Labonte held the Iron Man record with 655 consecutive starts, and his streak ended when he had to miss the 2000 Brickyard 400 due to injury. One of Earnhardt's former rivals, Ricky Rudd, would eventually pass Labonte by making his 656th consecutive race the following year in the 2002 Coca-Cola 600. As of 2022, Jeff Gordon is currently NASCAR's new Iron Man with 797 consecutive starts.

NAPA Auto Parts 500 

The NAPA Auto Parts 500 was held April 29 at California Speedway. Bobby Labonte won the pole.

Top Ten Results

  2 - Rusty Wallace
 24 - Jeff Gordon
  8 - Dale Earnhardt Jr.
 20 - Tony Stewart
 12 - Jeremy Mayfield
 28 - Ricky Rudd
 26 - Jimmy Spencer
 25 - Jerry Nadeau
 40 - Sterling Marlin
 77 - Robert Pressley

Failed to qualify: Kevin Lepage (No. 4), Buckshot Jones (No. 44), Shawna Robinson (No. 84)

This race was held on what would have been Dale Earnhardt's 50th birthday. His great friend and best adversary, Rusty Wallace, won an emotional race.
The race marked the 54th career win for Rusty Wallace. With this win, Wallace tied Lee Petty for seventh on NASCAR's all-time win list.
This was also Wallace's 16th straight season of winning at least one race (1986-2001). The streak would end after 2001, as Wallace did not return to Victory Lane until Martinsville in April 2004, 3 years and 106 races later.

Pontiac Excitement 400 

The Pontiac Excitement 400 was held May 5 at Richmond International Raceway. Mark Martin won the pole.

Top Ten Results

 20 - Tony Stewart
 24 - Jeff Gordon
  2 - Rusty Wallace
  1 - Steve Park
 28 - Ricky Rudd
 10 - Johnny Benson
  8 - Dale Earnhardt Jr.
 17 - Matt Kenseth
 36 - Ken Schrader
 18 - Bobby Labonte

Failed to qualify: Buckshot Jones (No. 44), Hermie Sadler (No. 13), Hut Stricklin (No. 90)

The Winston 

The 2001 edition of The Winston, took place on May 19, 2001, at Lowe's Motor Speedway. Rusty Wallace won the pole. 

This would be the very 1st running of the Winston that didn't feature Darrell Waltrip and Dale Earnhardt. Waltrip retired in 2000 and would now call the race from the NASCAR on FOX broadcast booth. Earnhardt died on the last lap of the Daytona 500 earlier in the season. They both competed in the 1st 16 events (1985 to 2000).

With this win, Jeff Gordon would become only the 2nd driver to score 3 victories in NASCAR's All-Star Race, joining Dale Earnhardt. In 2013, Gordon's future teammate Jimmie Johnson would pass both drivers, and become the 1st, and as of 2023, the only driver to score 4 All-Star Race wins (2003, 2006, 2012, & 2013). Unlike Johnson however, both Earnhardt and Gordon would win all 3 of their races, and then go on to win those season's championships. Earnhardt won his 3 All-Star races and championships in 1987, 1990, and 1993. Gordon would win his 3 All-Star races and championships in 1995, 1997, and this season (2001). As of 2023, Earnhardt and Gordon are the only 2 multiple time All-Star race winners to win all of their All-Star races and those championships in the same season. Out of Jimmie Johnson's 4 wins, he would win the season's championship twice in 2006 & 2013. Future All-Star Race winner Kyle Larson would go on to be a multiple time winner with 2 victories (2019 & 2021). With 1 of those 2 wins, Larson would go on to win that season's championship (2021). Only 3 more drivers, who scored just 1 All-Star win in their career, have accomplished winning the All-Star Race, along with winning that season's championship: Darrell Waltrip in 1985, Rusty Wallace in 1989, and future champion Chase Elliott in 2020.

Top 5
24-Jeff Gordon
88-Dale Jarrett
20-Tony Stewart
18-Bobby Labonte
25-Jerry Nadeau

Coca-Cola 600 

The Coca-Cola 600 was held May 27 at Lowe's Motor Speedway. Ryan Newman won the pole; this was the first career pole on his 2nd start at Lowe's on a limited schedule.

Top 10 Results
 99 - Jeff Burton
 29 - Kevin Harvick
 20 - Tony Stewart
  6 - Mark Martin
 18 - Bobby Labonte
 26 - Jimmy Spencer
 28 - Ricky Rudd
 88 - Dale Jarrett
 22 - Ward Burton
 12 - Jeremy Mayfield

Failed to qualify: John Andretti (No. 43), Kyle Petty (No. 45), Derrike Cope (No. 37), Mike Wallace (No. 7), Jeff Fultz (No. 54), Carl Long (No. 85)

Tony Stewart successfully performed the "Double Duty", also running the Indianapolis 500 the same day; Joe Gibbs Racing had Mike McLaughlin on standby if Stewart did not arrive on time. Stewart arrived less than half an hour before the start of the race. If Stewart did not arrive for the start of the Coca-Cola 600, McLaughlin would have been given credit for the start under NASCAR rules. Stewart had to start at the end of the field (43rd place) due to missing the mandatory drivers' meeting that is held 2 hours before any race. Stewart is also the only driver in history to finish in the top 10 and on the lead lap in both races. He finished sixth in the Indianapolis 500 and finished third in this race.
Dale Jarrett overcame a rib injury during qualifying to finish 8th. As a precaution, Jeff Green was on standby.
Even though Ryan Newman won the pole, he finished 43rd after crashing while leading on lap 10.

MBNA Platinum 400 

The MBNA Platinum 400 was held June 3 at Dover Downs International Speedway. Dale Jarrett won the pole after qualifying was canceled because of rain.

Top Ten Results

 24 - Jeff Gordon
  1 - Steve Park
  8 - Dale Earnhardt Jr.
 32 - Ricky Craven
 88 - Dale Jarrett
 40 - Sterling Marlin
 20 - Tony Stewart
 29 - Kevin Harvick
  6 - Mark Martin
 28 - Ricky Rudd

Failed to qualify: Rick Mast (No. 50), Jeff Green (No. 30), Kyle Petty (No. 45), Lance Hooper (No. 47), Dave Marcis (No. 71)

The race marked the 54th career win for Jeff Gordon. With this win, Gordon tied Lee Petty and Rusty Wallace for seventh on NASCAR's all-time win list. He led 381 of 400 laps in the win.

Kmart 400 

The Kmart 400 was held June 10 at Michigan International Speedway. Jeff Gordon won the pole.

Top Ten Results

 24 - Jeff Gordon*
 28 - Ricky Rudd
 40 - Sterling Marlin
 12 - Jeremy Mayfield
 02 - Ryan Newman
 90 - Hut Stricklin
 99 - Jeff Burton
 93 - Dave Blaney
  9 - Bill Elliott
 29 - Kevin Harvick

Failed to qualify: Mike Wallace (No. 7), Rick Mast (No. 50), Andy Houston (No. 96), Stacy Compton (No. 92), Kenny Wallace (No. 27)

This race was the Winston Cup Series debut for Shawna Robinson, the first woman to successfully attempt a Winston Cup Series race since Patty Moise in 1989.
The race marked the first career Top 5 finish for Ryan Newman, as well as being the last career Top 10 finish for Hut Stricklin.
This was the 100th career Winston Cup win for car owner Rick Hendrick and the team of Hendrick Motorsports after being in the sport for 18 seasons since its inception in 1984.
This was Jeff Gordon's 55th career win, which would permanently pass Lee Petty and Rusty Wallace on NASCAR's all-time win list.

Pocono 500 

The Pocono 500 was held June 17 at Pocono Raceway. Ricky Rudd won the pole.

Top Ten Results

 28 - Ricky Rudd
 24 - Jeff Gordon
 88 - Dale Jarrett
 40 - Sterling Marlin
  6 - Mark Martin
 17 - Matt Kenseth
 20 - Tony Stewart
 18 - Bobby Labonte
 36 - Ken Schrader
 99 - Jeff Burton

Failed to qualify: Andy Houston (No. 96), Kenny Wallace (No. 27)

 This was Ricky Rudd's first win since 1998.
 This was Ricky Rudd's 1st ever win from the pole in 27 attempts. He would tie Geoffrey Bodine for the all-time record for scoring the most poles before scoring his 1st win from that spot. As of 2021, that tied record between the 2 drivers stands.
 Ricky Rudd's scored his 1st ever Pocono victory in his 44th attempt. As of 2021, that record stands.

Dodge/Save Mart 350 

The Dodge/Save Mart 350 was held June 24 at Sears Point Raceway. Jeff Gordon won the pole.

Top Ten Results

 20 - Tony Stewart
  7 - Robby Gordon*
 24 - Jeff Gordon
 28 - Ricky Rudd
  2 - Rusty Wallace
 22 - Ward Burton
 18 - Bobby Labonte
 99 - Jeff Burton
  9 - Bill Elliott
  6 - Mark Martin

Failed to qualify: Andy Houston (No. 96), Kenny Wallace (No. 27), Anthony Lazzaro (No. 68), Jason Leffler (No. 04)

Jeff Gordon led the most laps alongside Ron Fellows. Robby Gordon controlled the later stages of the race before relinquishing the lead to Tony Stewart with 11 laps to go; Stewart would go on to win the race.
This was the first road course win for Tony Stewart.
Canadian road course ringer Ron Fellows almost won his first Winston Cup Series victory driving the #87 Chevrolet for Joe Nemechek team, leading 20 laps mid-way into the race. Fellows crashed with less than 10 laps to go, ending any chances for an upset win.
This race marked the career-best finish for Robby Gordon before he later won at Loudon in November 2001.

Pepsi 400 

The Pepsi 400 was held July 7 at Daytona International Speedway. Sterling Marlin won the pole.

Top Ten Results
  8 - Dale Earnhardt Jr.
 15 - Michael Waltrip
 21 - Elliott Sadler
 22 - Ward Burton
 18 - Bobby Labonte
 25 - Jerry Nadeau
  2 - Rusty Wallace
 99 - Jeff Burton
 11 - Brett Bodine
  7 - Mike Wallace

Failed to qualify: Buckshot Jones (No. 44), Ron Hornaday Jr. (No. 14), Hut Stricklin (No. 90), Mike Bliss (No. 27), Andy Hillenburg (No. 49)

This was the first Winston Cup race at Daytona since the death of Dale Earnhardt.
This was also the first Cup Series race on NBC under the 2001–2006 contract.
Son of the late Dale Earnhardt, Dale Earnhardt Jr. led 116 of the race's 160 laps on his way to an emotional victory in what is arguably one of the more memorable races in NASCAR history
Dale Earnhardt Jr.'s win, coupled with Michael Waltrip pushing him to the victory (the reverse of the finish in Daytona 500) made for an emotional moment. Earnhardt Jr., Waltrip, and their crews, as well as Chocolate Myers, a longtime crew member for Dale Earnhardt, all celebrated in the infield grass on the front stretch. Earnhardt Jr. and Waltrip shared a hug on top of Waltrip's No. 15 car.
This was the second straight season that a pair of drivers finished first and second in both Daytona races, but in the opposite positions (Dale Jarrett and Jeff Burton in 2000, when Jarrett won the Daytona 500, and Jeff Burton won the Pepsi 400, with both finishing in second to each other).

Tropicana 400 

The inaugural Tropicana 400 was held July 15 at Chicagoland Speedway. Todd Bodine won the pole.

Top Ten Results

 29 - Kevin Harvick
 77 - Robert Pressley* 
 28 - Ricky Rudd
 88 - Dale Jarrett
 26 - Jimmy Spencer
  6 - Mark Martin
 17 - Matt Kenseth
 97 - Kurt Busch
 40 - Sterling Marlin
  9 - Bill Elliott

Failed to qualify: Kyle Petty (No. 45), Dave Marcis (No. 71), Mike Bliss (No. 27), Shawna Robinson (No. 84)

Jeff Gordon and Dale Jarrett were tied for the points lead after this race.
2nd place would be Robert Pressley's best career NASCAR Cup Series finish.

New England 300 
The New England 300 was held July 22 at New Hampshire International Speedway. Jeff Gordon won the pole.

Top Ten Results

 88 - Dale Jarrett
 24 - Jeff Gordon
 28 - Ricky Rudd
 26 - Jimmy Spencer
 20 - Tony Stewart
  1 - Steve Park
 18 - Bobby Labonte
 29 - Kevin Harvick
  8 - Dale Earnhardt Jr.
  7 - Mike Wallace

Failed to qualify: Mike Bliss (No. 27)

Dale Jarrett and Jeff Gordon were tied for the points lead for the 2nd consecutive week.
This was the first Winston Cup Series race on TNT under the 2001–2006 contract, although the initial plans were for TBS Superstation to carry the races. Instead, Turner decided that NASCAR would better fit TNT's "We Know Drama" slogan.

Pennsylvania 500 

The Pennsylvania 500 was held July 29 at Pocono Raceway. Todd Bodine won the pole.

Top Ten Results

 18 - Bobby Labonte
  8 - Dale Earnhardt Jr.
 20 - Tony Stewart
  9 - Bill Elliott
 10 - Johnny Benson
  2 - Rusty Wallace
  6 - Mark Martin
 24 - Jeff Gordon
 77 - Robert Pressley
 32 - Ricky Craven

Failed to qualify: Andy Hillenburg (No. 49), Carl Long (No. 85)

Jeff Gordon took the points to lead from Dale Jarrett in this race and did not relinquish the lead for the rest of the year.

Brickyard 400 

The Brickyard 400 was held August 5 at Indianapolis Motor Speedway. Jimmy Spencer won the pole.

Top Ten Results

 24 - Jeff Gordon
 40 - Sterling Marlin
 10 - Johnny Benson
  2 - Rusty Wallace
 97 - Kurt Busch
 22 - Ward Burton
  1 - Steve Park
  9 - Bill Elliott
 32 - Ricky Craven
  8 - Dale Earnhardt Jr.

Failed to qualify: Kevin Lepage (No. 4), Derrike Cope (No. 37), Mike Wallace (No. 7), Hermie Sadler (No. 13), Ed Berrier (No. 95), David Keith (No. 57), Rick Mast (No. 27), Dave Marcis (No. 71), Kyle Petty (No. 45), Shawna Robinson (No. 84), Andy Hillenburg (No. 49)

 With the win, Jeff Gordon became the first three-time winner of the Brickyard 400.
 Many came from the back to the front for finishing. Jeff Gordon started 27th, Johnny Benson started 26th, Rusty Wallace started 37th, Kurt Busch started 34th, and Dale Earnhardt Jr. started 36th.
In the last 4 straight years (1998-2001), the point leader coming into this race went on to win the Brickyard 400, and then later on in the year, that driver went on to win the NASCAR  Winston Cup Championship. Jeff Gordon accomplished the feat twice, the first year in 1998, and the fourth year in 2001. Dale Jarrett did it in 1999, and Bobby Labonte did it in 2000.

Global Crossing @ The Glen 

The Global Crossing @ The Glen was held August 12 at Watkins Glen International. Dale Jarrett won the pole.

Top Ten Results

 24 - Jeff Gordon
 99 - Jeff Burton
 12 - Jeremy Mayfield
 28 - Ricky Rudd
 66 - Todd Bodine
 25 - Jerry Nadeau
 29 - Kevin Harvick
 77 - Boris Said*
 18 - Bobby Labonte
  1 - Steve Park

Failed to qualify: Mike Wallace (No. 7), Wally Dallenbach Jr. (No. 44)

This was another race where "road course ringers" were participating in the Cup Series. Jeff Gordon would win the race after leading the final 14 laps of the race. Robby Gordon, driving his final scheduled race for Richard Childress Racing, had the dominant car early on, but a pit road fire ended his hopes for victory; Ron Fellows would lead 3 laps early before breaking an axle, and Jeff Burton led the most laps.
This was Jeff Gordon's 4th Watkins Glen win in the last 5 events. This would also be Gordon's final win at The Glen.
Jeff Gordon won his seventh career road course race. With this win, Gordon became the all-time NASCAR winner on road courses, breaking out of a 3-way tie with Bobby Allison and Rusty Wallace. Gordon would win an additional 2 more road course races before he retired in 2015, both at Sonoma in 2004 & 2006. As of 2021, Gordon's all-time record still stands with a total of 9 road course wins. Tony Stewart is currently in 2nd with 8
Boris Said was the top-finishing non-regular series driver (road course ringer), as he finished 8th after running as high as third; it was Said's career-best finish at the time, in the #77 Jasper Motorsports Ford.

Pepsi 400 presented by Meijer 

The Pepsi 400 presented by Meijer was held August 19 at Michigan International Speedway. Ricky Craven won the pole. The race was shortened to 162 laps (324 miles) due to rain.

Top Ten Results

 40 - Sterling Marlin
 32 - Ricky Craven
  9 - Bill Elliott
 17 - Matt Kenseth
 10 - Johnny Benson
 93 - Dave Blaney
 24 - Jeff Gordon
  6 - Mark Martin
  1 - Steve Park
 19 - Casey Atwood

Failed to qualify: David Keith (No. 57), Buckshot Jones (No. 44)

This marked the 7th career win for Sterling Marlin, and his first in 170 races. His last win was in the 1996 Pepsi 400 at Daytona, which was also a Pepsi sponsored race, and that too was also a rain shortened race.
This race marked Dodge's first trip to victory lane since its return to NASCAR. Dodge's last win was with Neil Bonnett in Ontario in 1977.

Sharpie 500 

The Sharpie 500 was held August 25 at Bristol Motor Speedway. Jeff Green won the pole.

Top Ten Results

 20 - Tony Stewart
 29 - Kevin Harvick
 24 - Jeff Gordon
 28 - Ricky Rudd
  2 - Rusty Wallace
 88 - Dale Jarrett
  1 - Steve Park
 18 - Bobby Labonte
 40 - Sterling Marlin
  5 - Terry Labonte

Failed to qualify: Stacy Compton (No. 92), Kyle Petty (No. 45), Hermie Sadler (No. 13), Dave Marcis (No. 71), Hut Stricklin (No. 90), Carl Long (No. 85)

This would be Tony Stewart's 1st NASCAR win with the "500" moniker in the name of an event (500 Laps or 500 Miles). Even though he won a "500" moniker race at Phoenix in November 1999, that race was only 312 laps and 312 miles.

Mountain Dew Southern 500 

The Mountain Dew Southern 500 was held September 2 at Darlington Raceway. Kurt Busch won the pole.

Top Ten Results

 22 - Ward Burton
 24 - Jeff Gordon
 18 - Bobby Labonte
 20 - Tony Stewart
  9 - Bill Elliott
 99 - Jeff Burton
 28 - Ricky Rudd
 29 - Kevin Harvick
 25 - Jerry Nadeau
 36 - Ken Schrader

Failed to qualify: Andy Houston (No. 96), Dave Marcis (No. 71)

Steve Park did not race because of a bizarre accident in the South Carolina 200 (the Busch Grand National Series race) the day before that left him sidelined until early 2002.
This race ended under caution as a multi-car accident brought out the yellow flag coming to the final lap.
With this win, brothers Ward and Jeff Burton became the second set of brothers, joining Terry and Bobby Labonte, to win the Southern 500. 
This win marked the second and final time that Ward and Jeff Burton each won a race in the same season.
Ward Burton winning the Southern 500 in a Dodge, the first Southern 500 win for the manufacturer, and as well as the first win at Darlington since Buddy Baker won in 1971.

Chevrolet Monte Carlo 400 

The Chevrolet Monte Carlo 400 was held September 8 at Richmond International Raceway. Jeff Gordon won the pole.

Top Ten Results

 28 - Ricky Rudd
 29 - Kevin Harvick
  8 - Dale Earnhardt Jr.
 88 - Dale Jarrett
  2 - Rusty Wallace
 18 - Bobby Labonte
 20 - Tony Stewart
 26 - Jimmy Spencer
 99 - Jeff Burton
 10 - Johnny Benson

Failed to qualify: Andy Houston (No. 96), Hermie Sadler (No. 13), Hut Stricklin (No. 90), Carl Long (No. 85)

This race is remembered for Kevin Harvick almost spinning Ricky Rudd off turn 2 and Rudd saving his car from wrecking and coming back to win after bumping Harvick.
2001 marked the final time in his career that Ricky Rudd won multiple races in a season.

MBNA Cal Ripken Jr. 400 

The MBNA Cal Ripken Jr. 400 was held September 23 at Dover Downs International Speedway. Dale Jarrett won the pole.

Top Ten Results

  8 - Dale Earnhardt Jr.
 25 - Jerry Nadeau
 28 - Ricky Rudd
 24 - Jeff Gordon
 20 - Tony Stewart
 29 - Kevin Harvick
 33 - Joe Nemechek
 40 - Sterling Marlin
 19 - Casey Atwood
 55 - Bobby Hamilton

Failed to qualify: Rick Mast (No. 27), Jason Leffler (No. 01), Lance Hooper (No. 47), Dave Marcis (No. 71)

This was the first race to be held after the September 11th attacks. Most cars sported patriotic decals and tributes.

Protection One 400 

The inaugural Protection One 400 was held September 30 at Kansas Speedway. Jason Leffler won the pole.

Top Ten Results

 24 - Jeff Gordon
 02 - Ryan Newman
 28 - Ricky Rudd
  2 - Rusty Wallace
 40 - Sterling Marlin
  6 - Mark Martin
 77 - Robert Pressley
 20 - Tony Stewart
 97 - Kurt Busch
 93 - Dave Blaney

Failed to qualify: Rick Mast (No. 27), Kyle Petty (No. 45), Ron Hornaday Jr. (No. 14)

In 6 of the last 7 years including 2001 (1995-1999, 2001), Jeff Gordon won the most races in a season. 2001 was also the final season in his career that he won the most races in a season.
This was Jeff Gordon's third win at an inaugural event. He won the inaugural Brickyard 400 in 1994, and the inaugural race at Auto Club Speedway of California in 1997.
This was the last race for Jeremy Mayfield in the 12 car for Roger Penske. Rusty Wallace's younger brother Mike Wallace would be Rusty's new teammate as he replaced Mayfield for the rest of the season.

UAW-GM Quality 500 

The UAW-GM Quality 500 was held October 7 at Lowe's Motor Speedway. Jimmy Spencer won the pole.

Top Ten Results

 40 - Sterling Marlin
 20 - Tony Stewart
 22 - Ward Burton
  8 - Dale Earnhardt Jr.
 99 - Jeff Burton
 88 - Dale Jarrett
  2 - Rusty Wallace
 29 - Kevin Harvick
  6 - Mark Martin
 18 - Bobby Labonte

Failed to qualify: Kyle Petty (No. 45), Derrike Cope (No. 57), Jeff Green (No. 30), Robby Gordon (No. 31), Buckshot Jones (No. 44), Frank Kimmel (No. 46)

 This was Jimmie Johnson's first career Winston Cup Series start. Johnson started in the 15th position but was finished only 39th due to an accident.
 Four of the six drivers that failed to qualify were each from two major teams. Two of the six drivers were from Richard Childress Racing (Jeff Green (30) and Robby Gordon (31)), and the other two of the six drivers were from Petty Enterprises (Kyle Petty (45) and Buckshot Jones (44)).
 This race was to have been shown by NBC; however, prior to the race, the telecast was interrupted by an NBC News special report covering President George W. Bush's announcement of Operation Enduring Freedom, a U.S.-led military operation in Afghanistan in response to the September 11 attacks. Coverage of most of the race was shifted to TNT, while NBC would later re-join the race in simulcast with TNT as it neared completion.

Old Dominion 500 

The Old Dominion 500 was scheduled for October 14 at Martinsville Speedway, but was held October 15 due to rain. Todd Bodine won the pole.

Top Ten Results

 32 - Ricky Craven
 88 - Dale Jarrett
 22 - Ward Burton
 18 - Bobby Labonte
 99 - Jeff Burton
 10 - Johnny Benson
  6 - Mark Martin
 12 - Mike Wallace
 24 - Jeff Gordon
 40 - Sterling Marlin

Failed to qualify: Carl Long (No. 85), Kyle Petty (No. 45), Frank Kimmel (No. 46)

 This was Ricky Craven's first career Winston Cup Series victory. It was also the first for a car with the number 32.
 Kevin Harvick was in contention late in the event until he spun out Bobby Hamilton and NASCAR penalized him one lap for rough driving.
This was the penultimate race in the career of Dave Marcis (he would fail to qualify at Talladega, and Atlanta), he would finish 32nd, completing 493 of 500 laps.

EA Sports 500 

The EA Sports 500 was held on October 21 at Talladega Superspeedway. Stacy Compton won the pole.

Top Ten Results

  8 - Dale Earnhardt Jr.
 20 - Tony Stewart
 99 - Jeff Burton
 17 - Matt Kenseth
 55 - Bobby Hamilton
  1 - Kenny Wallace
 24 - Jeff Gordon
 33 - Joe Nemechek
  6 - Mark Martin
  7 - Kevin Lepage

Failed to qualify: Rick Mast (No. 91), Dave Marcis (No. 71)

This race would be remembered for the last lap. After Dale Earnhardt Jr. passed Bobby Labonte for the lead, Labonte tried to block Bobby Hamilton, going up high in turn two. Labonte got loose, making contact with Johnny Benson, causing Labonte to flip over and slide down the back straightaway on his roof, with an additional 14 cars being collected in the wreck. While that happened, Earnhardt Jr., Tony Stewart, and Jeff Burton raced back to the start/finish line. Entering the tri-oval, Earnhardt Jr. sailed away by three car lengths to take his third win of the season while Stewart and Burton battled for the runner-up spot.
Although he kept the win, Earnhardt Jr. was docked 25 points after his car failed post-race inspection, due to a shortened rear spoiler.
Earnhardt Jr. had also won the Winston No Bull 5 Million Dollar Bonus for the first time, one year after his father did it in the same race.
2001 marked the first time in seven years that Jeff Gordon did not win a restrictor-plate race.
Last career top-5 for Bobby Hamilton.

Checker Auto Parts 500 presented by Pennzoil 

The Checker Auto Parts 500 presented by Pennzoil was held October 28 at Phoenix International Raceway. Casey Atwood won the pole.

Top Ten Results

 99 - Jeff Burton
 12 - Mike Wallace
 28 - Ricky Rudd
 17 - Matt Kenseth
 20 - Tony Stewart
 24 - Jeff Gordon
 31 - Robby Gordon
 32 - Ricky Craven
 88 - Dale Jarrett
 10 - Johnny Benson

Failed to qualify: Rick Bogart (No. 70)

Jeff Burton became only the second repeat winner at Phoenix, and also the second driver to win back-to-back Phoenix races, joining Davey Allison, who accomplished the feat in 1991 and 1992.
2nd place would be Mike Wallace's best career NASCAR Cup Series finish.

Pop Secret Microwave Popcorn 400 

The Pop Secret Microwave Popcorn 400 was held November 4 at North Carolina Speedway. Kenny Wallace won the pole.

Top Ten Results

 33 - Joe Nemechek
  1 - Kenny Wallace
 10 - Johnny Benson
 88 - Dale Jarrett
 25 - Jerry Nadeau
 22 - Ward Burton
 20 - Tony Stewart
 28 - Ricky Rudd
 18 - Bobby Labonte
 17 - Matt Kenseth

Failed to qualify: Rick Mast (No. 90)
The race marked Andy Petree's second and final career win as a car owner.
This was the 2nd consecutive 2nd-place finish for two Wallace brothers (who are related to Rusty, the oldest and most dominant brother of the three) that have never won a Winston Cup points race (Mike finished 2nd a week prior to Phoenix, and Kenny finishes 2nd in this race).

Pennzoil Freedom 400 

The Pennzoil Freedom 400 was held on November 11 at Homestead-Miami Speedway. Bill Elliott won the pole.

Top Ten Results

  9 - Bill Elliott
 15 - Michael Waltrip
 19 - Casey Atwood
 99 - Jeff Burton
 40 - Sterling Marlin
 93 - Dave Blaney
 29 - Kevin Harvick
 18 - Bobby Labonte
 30 - Jeff Green
 01 - Jason Leffler

Failed to qualify: Rich Bickle (No. 49), Derrike Cope (No. 57), Ron Hornaday Jr. (No. 14), Hermie Sadler (No. 13), Carl Long (No. 85)

Casey Atwood nearly won the race, until a late-race pass by Bill Elliott.
It was the 41st career Winston Cup Series win for Bill Elliott. This was Elliott's first win in 226 races, dating back to his last win in the Southern 500 at Darlington in 1994. As of 2021, the 226 race winless streak is the longest drought in NASCAR history.
This was the first race since Richmond back in March 1992 that Bill Elliott won from the pole.
This would be the first time since Melling Racing and Bill Elliott himself at the Pepsi 400 in 1991, that the No. 9 went to victory lane.
The race marked the only top-five finish of Casey Atwood's career.
Jeff Gordon failed to clinch the NASCAR Winston Cup Championship due to finishing in 28th place in this event. He left Homestead with a 305-point lead, and that wasn't enough for him to clinch with 2 races to go. With 2 races to go, he needed to clinch the Championship with a 370+ point lead.
A pit road incident occurred on lap 112 when Ward Burton and Casey Atwood made contact, causing Ward to go into Ricky Rudd's pit stall, seriously injuring 2 crew members.

NAPA 500 

The NAPA 500 was held November 18 at Atlanta Motor Speedway. Dale Earnhardt Jr. won the pole.

Top Ten Results

 18 - Bobby Labonte
 40 - Sterling Marlin
 29 - Kevin Harvick
 25 - Jerry Nadeau
 22 - Ward Burton
 24 - Jeff Gordon
  8 - Dale Earnhardt Jr.
 88 - Dale Jarrett
 20 - Tony Stewart
 99 - Jeff Burton

Failed to qualify: Mark Green (No. 41), Robby Gordon (No. 31), Jason Leffler (No. 01), Kurt Busch (No. 97), Rick Mast (No. 90), Ron Hornaday Jr. (No. 14), Dave Marcis (No. 71), Frank Kimmel (No. 46)

The race was scheduled to be the finale to the 2001 season, but as the fall race in New Hampshire had been postponed due to the attacks of September 11, it became the penultimate race instead.
Jerry Nadeau nearly won this race, but ran out of gas with half a lap to go, giving way to Bobby Labonte.
Jeff Gordon clinches the 2001 NASCAR Winston Cup Series Championship with his sixth-place finish, joining Richard Petty and Dale Earnhardt to win four or more NASCAR Championships.
With this championship win, Jeff Gordon and Dale Earnhardt are the only 2 drivers to win 4 or more titles under the Winston Cup sponsorship. They are also the only 2 drivers in NASCAR history to win 4 or more Championships under one points system, and they both accomplished it in the very same system. They did it in a points system that was created by Bob Latford back in 1975, and ended in 2003. They won a combined total of 11 Championships under the Bob Latford Winston Cup points system (Earnhardt with 7, and Gordon with 4).
Jeff Gordon wins the title with having 6 wins, 18 top 5s, and 24 top 10s. His six wins are the fewest victories in any of his four championship-winning seasons.
This was the fourth straight season that a driver clinched the NASCAR Winston Cup Championship with one race to go. Jeff Gordon accomplished the feat twice in those four seasons, the first year in 1998, and the fourth year in 2001. Dale Jarrett did it in 1999, and Bobby Labonte did it in 2000.
This would be the final race Dave Marcis would fail to qualify for. Dave would wrap up his career at the 2002 Daytona 500.

New Hampshire 300 

The New Hampshire 300 was scheduled for September 16 but was moved to November 23 (the Friday after Thanksgiving) due to the September 11 terrorist attacks. The starting order was set according to the owner's points as of September 10 meaning new champion Jeff Gordon would start first.

Top Ten Results

 31 - Robby Gordon
 40 - Sterling Marlin
 18 - Bobby Labonte
 17 - Matt Kenseth
 20 - Tony Stewart
 25 - Jerry Nadeau
 77 - Robert Pressley
 11 - Brett Bodine
  6 - Mark Martin
 88 - Dale Jarrett

42 cars were entered for this race instead of the traditional 43, as the Eel River Racing Team had folded, however two of their final three former drivers at the time were still entered in the race itself. Kenny Wallace was a replacement for an injured Steve Park at DEI, and Rick Mast replaced the fired Hut Stricklin at Donlavey Racing. This was the last race to feature less than 43 cars until the 2014 Kentucky race. Beginning with the 2016 Sprint Cup season, fields are now a max of 40 cars.
The win was Robby Gordon's first career victory in the Cup Series and one of only 17 times he raced in 2001 due to having been unexpectedly fired from the Morgan-McClure team after just 5 races. This race was also notable for the battle between Robby and Jeff Gordon (no relation) that led to much bumping between the two and resulting in Jeff Gordon spinning out of the lead, causing the final caution. Jeff was black-flagged for retaliating and after being held a lap by officials, he ended up in 15th place. Robby Gordon held off Sterling Marlin for the win. It would be the No. 31 team's very first win in NASCAR.
This was Robby's second oval win in his motorsports career (his first coming in an IndyCar race at Phoenix in 1995), and only oval victory in NASCAR.
In victory lane, Robby, when asked about the incident with Jeff, said that it was an accident and that he was not embarrassed about his win since he saw Jeff Gordon do something similar to win at a previous race. Robby also donated all his prize money to the victims of the 9/11 attacks.
Robby Gordon became the 5th driver in 2001 to win his 1st ever Winston Cup race, a modern-era record (this record would later be matched 1 year later in 2002, in 2011, and most recently in 2022). He also became the 19th different driver to win a race in 2001, another modern-era record.
As of 2021, Robby Gordon would become the 2nd driver in NASCAR to win a race after failing to qualify the previous week (Dale Jarrett was the 1st in 1994 when he failed to qualify at North Wilkesboro, and then won the following race at Charlotte).
Last points race without Ryan Newman and Jimmie Johnson until the Pennzoil 400 and Brickyard 400 in 2020.

Drivers' championship 

(key) Bold - Pole position awarded by time. Italics - Pole position set by owner's points standings. * – Most laps led.

Rookie of the Year 
Kevin Harvick emerged as the victor of the Rookie of the Year battle despite not declaring for the award until the second race of the season, as he took over for Dale Earnhardt following his fatal crash. Harvick won 2 races and finished 9th in points. Kurt Busch finished 2nd, despite only having one year of experience in a major NASCAR series and failing to qualify for one race. 3rd-place finisher Casey Atwood was pre-season favorite, but was held back due to a rough start and only finished 26th in points. Jason Leffler had a sub-par season that cost him his job with Chip Ganassi Racing, and Ron Hornaday Jr. was a disappointment after years of success in the Busch and Truck series. The last-place driver was Andy Houston, another pre-season favorite who had a tough season, suffering from several DNQs and DNFs that resulted in his team closing after the Kansas race.

Facts 
This was the first season under the new television deal with Fox Sports and NBC Sports/Turner Sports. Fox broadcast the season-opening Daytona 500 for the first time and split coverage of the first half of the season with cable partner FX. NBC broadcast the Pepsi 400 at Daytona in July and split-second half the coverage of the season with TNT. 
There were 19 different race winners, a new record for the series.
Five of these race winners won a Winston Cup race for the first time: Michael Waltrip in the Daytona 500, Kevin Harvick in the spring Atlanta race, Elliott Sadler in the spring Bristol race, Ricky Craven in the fall Martinsville race, and Robby Gordon in the season finale at New Hampshire.
There were six first-time pole sitters in the 2001 Winston Cup season: Stacy Compton, Ryan Newman, Kurt Busch, Jason Leffler, Casey Atwood and Jeff Green. Up until Atwood's lead lap finish at Phoenix, the best finish for a first-time pole sitter was Leffler, when he finished 32nd at Kansas. He was on the lead lap with nine to go there, only to wreck. Compton finished 43rd at Talladega, as did Newman at Charlotte. Busch came in 42nd after a crash at Darlington, and Green came in 39th after one in Bristol.
The 2001 season marked the third full-time Winston Cup season that Mark Martin failed to win a race. His first winless season was in 1982 (his first full-time season), the second in 1996. Martin finished 12th in the final points standings, making this the first time since 1988 that he didn't finish in the Top 10 in points, ending a streak of 12 consecutive seasons.
Bill Elliott, Sterling Marlin, and Ricky Rudd each won a Winston Cup race for the first time since 1994, 1996, and 1998.
Jeff Gordon won his fourth Winston Cup Championship, a feat that only two other drivers – Richard Petty and Dale Earnhardt – had accomplished at the time. This was the final championship for Gordon.
As the 2001 season came to an end, Jeff Gordon's winning average was 20 percent, winning 1 race in every 5 starts. After 2001, he recorded 58 victories in 293 races.
No rookies competed in all 36 races during this year; the closest were Kevin Harvick, Kurt Busch, and Casey Atwood with 35. Harvick did not compete in the Daytona 500, Atwood did not qualify for the spring Atlanta race, and Busch failed to qualify for the fall race in Atlanta.
This was supposed to be the last season finale to be held at Atlanta. However, due to the September 11 attacks, the fall New Hampshire race was postponed until the first available date, which came after the Atlanta event.
Dale Earnhardt was given credit for a 57th-place finish in the final points standings after losing his life on the last lap of the season-opening Daytona 500.
Dale Earnhardt posthumously won the 2001 NASCAR's Most Popular Driver Award after Bill Elliott withdrew form the award out of respect for Dale.
2001 was the last full-time Winston Cup season for Ron Hornaday Jr.; Buckshot Jones, Andy Houston, and Jason Leffler. Hornaday Jr. went to the Busch Grand National Series in 2002 then back to the NASCAR Craftsman Truck Series in 2005. Jones was fired after a few races that same year due to poor finishes. Houston went back to the Trucks Series and currently serves as the spotter for Cole Custer, having previously served as the spotter for Austin Dillon until 2020. Leffler attempted to have a full-time ride with Joe Gibbs Racing in 2005 but was fired halfway into the season. He went back into Grand National from 2006 to 2011 then the Trucks for 2012. After being unemployed in 2013, he died in a sprint car racing accident.
Future champion Jimmie Johnson made his NASCAR Winston Cup Series debut for Hendrick Motorsports at the fall race in Charlotte. He would make two more starts during the 2001 season before driving full-time in 2002. 
2001 was the first season without three-time NASCAR champion Darrell Waltrip since the 1971 season.
2001 was the last year for teams Eel River Racing and Melling Racing.
2001 was the first year for teams Evernham Motorsports and BAM Racing.
2001 was the last season without Greg Biffle and Jamie McMurray until 2017 and 2020 (They would run several races in 2002 before joining as full-time in 2003 until their retirements in 2016 and 2019).
Until the 2014 Quaker State 400 at Kentucky Speedway, the 2001 New Hampshire 300 was the last race to have 42 starters.
Last career Top 5 points finishes for Ricky Rudd and Dale Jarrett.
Last career Top 10 points finish for Sterling Marlin.
First career Top 10 points finish for Kevin Harvick.
Kevin Harvick was originally to run a third Childress car #30 America Online Chevy with up to 7 races including his debut at Atlanta in March and full-time in 2002.

See also 
 2001 NASCAR Busch Series
 2001 NASCAR Craftsman Truck Series

References

External links 
Winston Cup Standings and Statistics for 2001

 
NASCAR Cup Series seasons